Antonín Landa (2 May 1899 – 8 April 1968) was a Czech painter. His work was part of the painting event in the art competition at the 1932 Summer Olympics.

References

1899 births
1968 deaths
20th-century Czech painters
Czech male painters
Olympic competitors in art competitions
Artists from Prague
20th-century Czech male artists